Fereydoon Hoveyda ( Fereydūn Hoveyda, 21 September 1924 – 3 November 2006) was an Iranian diplomat, writer and thinker. He was the Iranian ambassador to the United Nations from 1971 until 1979.

Early life and education
Hoveyda was born in Damascus on 23 September 1924 where his father, Habibollah Hoveyda, was the Consul-General of Persia. His mother was Afsar-ol-Molouk Fatmeh, a Qajar princess. Upon marriage his father was given the title of Ayn al-Molk (Eye of the Kingdom) by the Qajar ruler of the country.

His brother, Amir Abbas Hoveyda, a former prime minister of Iran under the Shah, was executed after the Iranian Revolution in 1979. They were nephews of Abdol Hossein Sardari, who is known for saving many Jews in Paris during World War II.

Fereydoun Hoveyda was raised in Lebanon, Saudi Arabia, and Iran. He completed a Ph.D. in international law and economics at the Sorbonne, Paris, France in 1948.

Career
Hoveyda joined the foreign ministry in the early 1940s. A participant in the final drafting of the Universal Declaration of Human Rights, he worked in UNESCO from 1951 to 1966. In the late 1960s, he returned to Iran and worked in the Iranian Foreign Ministry as the undersecretary for international and economic affairs. He was also deputy foreign minister. From 1971 to 1979 he represented Iran at the United Nations.

Having been forced out of the Iranian Foreign Ministry following the 1979 revolution, Hoveyda became a senior fellow and member of the Executive Committee of the National Committee on American Foreign Policy (NCAFP).

Apart from politics, he was active in the field of cinema and was a founding member of the editorial board of the celebrated film magazine Cahiers du cinéma.

Works 
Hoveyda was a well-known author of 18 novels and non-fiction books in French, English, and German.

 HISTOIRE DU ROMAN POLICIER, 1965
 
 Dans une terre étrange, 1968
 Les quarantaines, 1962 (French Edition) 
 Les Neiges du Sinai, 1973 (French Edition) 
 
 Que Veulent les Arabes? (What do Arabs Want?), 1991 (French Edition) 
 L'islam bloque? (French Edition), 1992  
 The Sword of Islam
 Le Glaive de l'Islam 
 War and American Women : Heroism, Deeds and Controversy, 1997 (Co-authored with William Breuer) 
 The Broken Crescent: The Threat of Militant Islamic Fundamentalism, 1998 (Co-authored with Loustaunau, Martha O)  S
 The Hidden Meaning of Mass Communications (2000)
 The Shah and the Ayatollah: Islamic Revolution and Iranian Mythology (2003)
 Dead End Islam

He was also the cowriter of the screenplay for Roberto Rossellini's 1959 film India.

Personal life and death
Hoveyda wed twice. His first spouse, Touran Mansour, with whom he married in the 1940s was the daughter of Ali Mansur, one of the prime ministers of Iran.

Hoveyda died in Clifton, Virginia on 3 November 2006 at age 82 after a long fight against cancer. He left behind his second wife Gisela and two daughters Mandana and Roxana.

References

External links
 Hoveyda Fereydoon's list of published books
 Fereydoon Hoveyda IMDb
 An interview with Fereydoun Hoveyda
 Fereydoun Hoveyda, The Washington Post
 Fereydoon Hoveyda at the United Nations Digital Library

1924 births
2006 deaths
Iranian writers
Iranian diplomats
Permanent Representatives of Iran to the United Nations
UNESCO officials
Iranian emigrants to the United States
People of the Iranian Revolution
Deaths from cancer in Virginia
Exiles of the Iranian Revolution in the United States
Rastakhiz Party politicians
Iranian officials of the United Nations
Iranian expatriates in Syria